This table displays the top-rated primetime television series of the 1961–62 season as measured by Nielsen Media Research.

References

1961 in American television
1962 in American television
1961-related lists
1962-related lists
Lists of American television series